BeTV was a pay television channel, owned by Sony Pictures Entertainment in the Asia-Pacific region. Launched on 2 April 2012, it replaced AXN Beyond as a spin-off of AXN Asia and Sony Entertainment Television. Selected programs from AXN Philippines and SET were exclusively available in the Philippine feed of the channel.
AXN Beyond HD, renamed BeTV HD on 2 April 2012. The renamed channel would become the first channel that ceases to be carried on Astro B.yond HD and Astro B.yond PVR on 26 August 2013 at midnight.
BeTV was finally shut down on 15 October 2014 due to its merger with SET to form Sony Channel.

Feeds
 Southeast Asian feed: available for most countries in the region. It lasted two months, from 1 August until 30 September 2015.
 Philippine feed: available only to that certain country. Its programming schedule was similar to the Southeast Asian feed, with local advertisements and featuring programming imported from AXN and SET. It was shut down in October 2014.
 Malaysian feed:  – It branched off the Southeast Asian feed. Its HD feed ceased broadcasting on 26 August 2013 )

Programming
The channel mainly aired popular shows and movies syndicated from the United Kingdom and the United States.

See also
 AXN Asia
 Animax Asia
 GEM
 ONE
 Sony Channel
 SET Asia (Indian region)
List of programs broadcast by BeTV (Asia Pacific)

References

External links
 Official Website (Main for SIN/HK/THAI/JKT)
 Official Website (MY/PH only)

Television channels and stations established in 2012
Television channels and stations disestablished in 2013
Sony Pictures Television
Defunct television channels